Ignacio Morales may refer to:

 Ignacio Morales (taekwondo) (born 1995), Chilean taekwondo athlete
 Ignacio Morales (footballer) (born 1998), Argentine forward